Patty Jordan (born December 2, 1959) is an American professional golfer who played on the LPGA Tour.

Jordan won once on the LPGA Tour in 1988.

Professional wins

LPGA Tour wins (1)

Futures Tour wins (1)
1984 Sarasota Stingers Classic

References

External links
 

American female golfers
Wake Forest Demon Deacons women's golfers
LPGA Tour golfers
Golfers from New York (state)
Sportspeople from Buffalo, New York
1959 births
Living people